Elf Defense Eng is an iOS game developed by South Korean studio Jellyoasis Inc. and released on February 1, 2012.

Critical reception
The game has a Metacritic rating of 89% based on 4 critic reviews.

References

2012 video games
Android (operating system) games
IOS games
Tower defense video games
Video games developed in South Korea